The Nokia 6233 phone made by Nokia is the successor to the Nokia 6230i. It is a 3G/GSM/WCDMA mobile phone that runs the Series 40 3rd Edition, Feature Pack 1 UI on the Nokia operating system.

The Latvian operator LMT offered a "LMT 15" branded version for its anniversary in 2007, with the logo located just below the screen.

Features
The phone has two stereo speakers with surround sound. It supports a variety of music formats including AAC, MP3 and WMA files.  The latest firmware is version 5.60. It has a camera which can take photos at a resolution of 2 megapixels (1200 x 1600), and videos at VGA (640 x 480) resolution, as well as MP3 playback, Bluetooth, infrared, radio, games and Internet access.

Nokia 6233 Music Edition
Dubbed "Music Edition", a special white colour version of the Nokia 6233 is sold in Asian Pacific regions. It supports A2DP Bluetooth profile, meaning it is compatible with stereo Bluetooth headsets, providing better audio fidelity. This edition is sold with a larger MicroSD card (512MB instead of 64MB) and a speaker dock with a USB connection to a PC.

Nokia 6234
The Nokia 6234 is similar to the Nokia 6233, but was made available exclusively to Vodafone  subscribers. It can however be unlocked for use with other networks. It differs from the 6233 having a stainless steel front cover, Vodafone logos and Vodafone branded software.

Specifications sheet

Reception

Know Your Mobile gave the phone a positive review, saying it was "A terrific 3G phone that should appeal to business phone users".

References

External links

Nokia 6233 Product Page
Nokia 6233 Developer Device Details 
Nokia 6233 Official phone support 
Nokia 6234 Product Page
Specific Absorption Rate (SAR) Rating

6233
Mobile phones introduced in 2005
Mobile phones with infrared transmitter